Incurvaria oehlmanniella is a moth of the family Incurvariidae. It is found in Europe and across the Palearctic to eastern Siberia.

Its wingspan is 12–16 mm. Head deep ochreous yellow. Forewings dark bronzy-fuscous, mixed with purplish ; a subtriangular dorsal spot before middle, a smaller one before
tornus, and a third sometimes nearly obsolete on costa at 3/4 pale yellowish. Hindwings rather dark purplish-grey. It flies from April to July, depending on the location.

The larvae feed on bilberry, cloudberry, Swida and Prunus.

References

External links

Incurvaria oehlmanniella at UKmoths
Lepidoptera of Belgium
Lepiforum.de
bladmineerders.nl 

Moths described in 1796
Incurvariidae
Moths of Europe
Taxa named by Jacob Hübner